Rocroi is a commune in the Ardennes department in northern France.

The central area is a notable surviving example of a bastion fort.

Population

History
Rocroi was fortified by Francis I of France and expanded by Henry II of France. Because of its strategic location in the north of France it changed hands a number of times during wars. It is best known for the Battle of Rocroi in 1643.  In the 1670s the fortifications were re-modelled by the French engineer Vauban.

In 1815, two months after the Battle of Waterloo, the town was taken by Prussian and British forces (on 16 August).

See also
Communes of the Ardennes department
List of bastion forts

References

External links

 Webpage about the fortifications of Rocroi

Communes of Ardennes (department)
Champagne (province)
Ardennes communes articles needing translation from French Wikipedia
Vauban fortifications in France